Ladoga is a rural locality (a village) in Vyatkinskoye Rural Settlement, Sudogodsky District, Vladimir Oblast, Russia. The population was 1 as of 2010. There are 2 streets.

Geography 
Ladoga is located 5 km north of Sudogda (the district's administrative centre) by road. Lavrovo is the nearest rural locality.

References 

Rural localities in Sudogodsky District